Sergi Pedrerol Cavallé (born 16 December 1969 in Molins de Rei, Catalonia) is a former water polo player from Spain, who was a member of the national team that won the golden medal at the 1996 Summer Olympics in Atlanta, Georgia.

Four years earlier, when Barcelona hosted the Summer Olympics, he was on the squad that captured the silver medal.  Pedrerol competed in four Summer Olympics, starting in 1992. With the Spanish National Team he also won the world title twice, in Perth 1998 and Fukuoka 2001.

See also
 Spain men's Olympic water polo team records and statistics
 List of Olympic champions in men's water polo
 List of Olympic medalists in water polo (men)
 List of players who have appeared in multiple men's Olympic water polo tournaments
 List of world champions in men's water polo
 List of World Aquatics Championships medalists in water polo

References

External links
 

1969 births
Living people
People from Molins de Rei
Sportspeople from the Province of Barcelona
Water polo players from Catalonia
Spanish male water polo players
Water polo drivers
Left-handed water polo players
Water polo players at the 1992 Summer Olympics
Water polo players at the 1996 Summer Olympics
Water polo players at the 2000 Summer Olympics
Water polo players at the 2004 Summer Olympics
Medalists at the 1992 Summer Olympics
Medalists at the 1996 Summer Olympics
Olympic gold medalists for Spain in water polo
Olympic silver medalists for Spain in water polo
World Aquatics Championships medalists in water polo
Sportsmen from Catalonia